is a passenger railway station in the city of Tondabayashi, Osaka Prefecture, Japan, operated by the private railway company Kintetsu Railway.

Lines

Station layout
The station consists of a single side platform serving one ground-level bi-directional track.Ticket gates are located at the north end of the platform.

Platforms

Adjacent stations

History
The station was closedown March 31, 1912 and reopened on January 9, 1917. It was renamed to its present name on March 8, 1933. It was closed again from June 1, 1945 to July 1, 1946.

Passenger statistics
In fiscal 2018, the station was used by an average of 6537 passengers daily

Surrounding area
Tondabayashi City Hall
Tondabayashi Police Station
Tondabayashi Post Office
Tondabayashi-nishiguchi Post Office
Tondabayashi Junior & Senior High School
Kanan High School (Osaka Prefecture)

See also
List of railway stations in Japan

References

External links

 Tondabayashi-nishiguchi Station  

Railway stations in Japan opened in 1904
Railway stations in Osaka Prefecture
Tondabayashi, Osaka